Round Prairie Township is one of eighteen townships in Callaway County, Missouri, USA.  As of the 2010 census, its population was 1038.

Geography
It contains four cemeteries: Boydsville, Hundley, Millers Creek and Paris Fork; as well as the streams of Davis Creek, Millers Creek and Smith Creek also run through this township.

History

Created on May 14, 1821, the township initially covered at least the northern 2/3 of the western border areas of Callaway County, from "the township line (boundary?) of 45 and 46 northward to the Audrain County line and eastward to a line along what is now the western boundary of West Fulton Township". 

In 1824, Round Prairie Township was reduced in size by the creation of Cedar Township to its south from what was the remainder of the western sector of Cote Sans Dessein Township, and within a year, in 1825, Round Prairie Township was further reduced substantially in size with the creation of a larger-than-today Bourbon township from its northern sector. This continued for about 60 years.

A Round Prairie Post Office, from May 30, 1827 to June 16, 1841, 'about one-half mile north of New Bloomfield' was clearly inside previous Round Prairie Township boundaries, but near the boundary with the new Cedar Township created from its southern portion in 1824 (and 50 years prior to the creation of Guthrie Township). (See Missouri State Historical Society on Callaway place name changes.)

Between 1883 and 1897, Round Prairie Township was again reduced in size by the creation of Guthrie Township from its southernmost area.  These changes are significant for research on historical events and genealogy.
A detailed historic map of Round Prairie township in 1930, with about the same boundaries as exist today, can be found on the last page of the atlas posted at:
 http://cdm16795.contentdm.oclc.org/cdm/ref/collection/moplatbooks/id/656
Further historical maps and texts describing historic township boundaries are posted in the bibliography of the article on Callaway County, Missouri.

References

 USGS Geographic Names Information System (GNIS)

External links
 US-Counties.com
 City-Data.com

Townships in Callaway County, Missouri
Jefferson City metropolitan area
Townships in Missouri